is a railway station in Fushimi, Kyoto, Japan.

Lines
Kintetsu Railway
Kyoto Line

Building
The station has two platforms and four tracks.

Platforms

History
1979 - The station begins operating
2000 - Promoted to Semi-Express stop
2007 - Starts using PiTaPa

Adjacent stations

References

External links

 Station Facilities and Service
 Station Map

Railway stations in Kyoto
Railway stations in Japan opened in 1979